= B League =

B League may refer to

- B.League, the Japanese basketball league
- Bangladesh Premier League (football)
